Delamarche is a French surname. Notable people with the surname include:
 Charles François Delamarche (1740–1817), French geographer and mapmaker
 Félix Delamarche, French geographer and engineer
 Olivier Delamarche (born 1966), French economic analyst

French-language surnames